In law, a person is acting in a position if they are not serving in the position on a permanent basis. This may be the case if the position has not yet been formally created, the person is only occupying the position on an interim basis, the person does not have a mandate, or if the person meant to execute the role is incompetent or incapacitated.

Business 
Organizations are advised to have a succession plan including the designation of an acting CEO if the person in that job vacates that position before a replacement has been determined. For example, the lead director on the board of directors may be designated to assume the responsibilities of the CEO until the board finds a new CEO.

Politics 
Examples of acting positions in politics include acting mayor, acting governor, acting president, and acting prime minister. Officials in an acting position usually do not have the full powers of a properly appointed official, and are often the proper official's deputy or longest serving subordinate. Being placed in an acting position is a good indicator that the acting person has the confidence of their superiors or colleagues, and is likely to be chosen for the position on a permanent basis.

Legal frameworks

Commonwealth 
In Commonwealth countries including Australia and Canada, the Carltona doctrine is the overarching legal principle governing when a minister may be said to be acting for or on behalf of a government department.

United States 
The 1910 edition of Black's Law Dictionary defines "acting" as a "term employed to designate a locum tenens who is performing the duties of an office to which he does not himself claim title". The 1914 edition of Corpus Juris Secundum gives much the same account.

Fraser v. United States, the first case cited in the Black's entry on "acting", concerns James G. Hill, the Supervising Architect of the Treasury. Hill had been suspended with pay while being investigated for a charge of fraud. Another person, John Fraser, was then directed by the Secretary of the Treasury to take charge of and perform the duties of Hill's office as "Acting" Supervising Architect. Officially, Fraser was merely a contractor who had been contracted to oversee the construction of a building for the Bureau of Engraving and Printing. When Hill was returned to his position some five and a half months later, Fraser sought to be compensated for the time he had worked as Acting Supervising Architect, seeking the difference between the salary for that office and his much lower pay as a contracting architect for the Treasury. The Court of Claims found that the "acting" position was not a statutory creation, and that Fraser was entitled to no pay beyond that of his contract for the period.

The rules for appointment of acting officials are covered in many cases by the Federal Vacancies Reform Act of 1998 (FVRA). Legal scholar Anne Joseph O'Connell notes that one central—and unresolved—question about the nature of acting officials under FVRA is their status under the Appointments Clause of the Constitution of the United States. O'Connell observes that portions of FVRA, an act of Congress which sets out a detailed scheme for filling vacant positions in federal agencies, may be unconstitutional if acting officials can be "principal" officers under the Appointments Clause. The constitutional issue emerges because the Appointments Clause requires principal officers to be appointed by the President with the advice and consent of the Senate. If acting officers who take office pursuant to FVRA—not pursuant to presidential nomination and Senate confirmation—can be considered principal officers, then the FVRA would be unconstitutional to the extent that it allows this to occur. Heilpern, for his part, argues that acting Cabinet-level officials are principal officers.

See also
Interim (disambiguation)
Regent

References

Sources 

 
 
 
 

Legal terminology